Varin is a district located in Siem Reap province, in north-west Cambodia. According to the 1998 census of Cambodia, it had a population of 19,818.

Administrative divisions 
VarinIs a district in Siem Reap. The district has 5 communes and 29 villages.

References 

Districts of Cambodia
Geography of Siem Reap province